William Dobslaw is an American musician, producer, manager, and businessman from South Bend, Indiana, United States, famed for his association with the 1960s rock band, the Rivieras.

Career
In 1963 Dobslaw discovered the local band, the Rivieras (consisting of Marty Fortson, Otto Nuss, Doug Gean, Joe Pennell, and Paul Dennert). Dobslaw working closely with, Dobslaw became the band's manager, and was instrumental in booking them for shows, as well as a recording session at Columbia Recording Studios. Dobslaw oversaw the production, manufacturing, and distribution of the band's records. The Rivieras' first session yielded the hit, "California Sun". On its way to the top, rhythm guitarist and vocalist Fortson and lead guitarist Pennell already committed to joining the Marines. Dobslaw was responsible for keeping the band together; he stepped in as the band's new vocalist, as Jim Boal was brought in as the new lead guitarist. Willie Gaut was later brought in as rhythm guitarist and occasional vocalist. Under Dobslaw, the band continued to achieve chart activity and successful tours. Eight more singles were released, as well as two full-length albums. By 1965, the band's popularity had waned as the band struggled with distribution and the  changing music scene. From this point on, Dobslaw stepped down as vocalist, but still remained the bands' manager until the band officially folded the following year.

After the Rivieras disbanded, Dobslaw briefly left music and became a businessman. Around 1973, Dobslaw returned to his musical roots, switching gears to barbershop music. After viewing The Valleyaires, a South Bend group, Dobslaw joined the barbershop group. To this day, he is still an active member.

Riviera label
After discovering the Rivieras in 1963, Dobslaw financed their first recording session, as well as pressed and distributed the following record independently through his newly created Riviera label. The ensuing success of "California Sun", coupled with distribution by USA Records, saw the label continue to distribute the Rivieras' records for the entirety of their career. With the disbanding of the band, the label went defunct by 1965/1966.

In addition to the Rivieras, Dobslaw signed one other band to the label. Originally known as the Kastaways, the Sigma Five released two 7" singles between 1964 and 1965. Riviera also released one full-length LP; Campus Party by the Rivieras in 1964. This album was the follow-up to the band's debut album, Let's Have a Party, which was released on USA Records. Most records released on the label without wide distribution are scarce to find today, and demand high values in the collectors' market.

Discography

References

American male musicians
American male pop singers
Record producers from Indiana
Living people
Musicians from South Bend, Indiana
Businesspeople from Indiana
Year of birth missing (living people)